This is a list of notable Belgian Turks.

Academia
, professor of sociology at the Université Libre de Bruxelles
, researcher in archaeology at the Centre National de la Recherche Scientifique

Arts and literature
Anthony Asael, international photographer
Kenan Görgün, writer 
Mahmut Karadağ, fashion designer 
, journalist
, journalist

Business
Şefik Birkiye, architect and founder of Vizzion Architects and Vizzion Europe

Cinema and television

, actor 
R. Kan Albay, film director 
, film producer 
, actor
,, director 
, actor
, actress and TV presenter 
,, comedian
Hande Kodja, actress 
 Gönül Meral, Miss Hainaut (2013)
, TV presenter 
Zeynep Sever, winner of Miss Belgium 2009 
, actress

Music

Hadise, singer 
, singer
Kubat, singer
Melike Tarhan, musical artist 
Gulus Gulcugil Turkmen
Tuğba Yurt, singer

Politics 

Meyrem Almaci, President of the Groen party
Cemal Çavdarlı, former member of the SP.A and the LDD; current member of the AKP 
Nawal Ben Hamou, member of the PS  
Meryem Kaçar, member of the Groen 
Serdar Kilic, member of the PS  
Emir Kir, Mayor of Saint-Josse-ten-Noode
Selahattin Koçak, former member of the SP.A and current member of the VLD 
Hasan Koyuncu, member of the PS 
Mahinur Ozdemir,  youngest and first female member of parliament with hijab; former member of cdH 
Özlem Özen, member of the PS   
Emin Özkara, former member of the PS  
Fatma Pehlivan, member of the SP.A 
Resul Tapmaz, member of the SP.A 
Ergün Top, member of the CD&V 
Güler Turan, member of the SP.A  
Hilâl Yalçin, member of the CD&V  
Ayse Yigit, member of the PVDA 
Veli Yüksel, member of the VLD

Sports

Izzet Akgül, football player
Bülent Akın, football player
Murat Akın, football player
Hakan Bayraktar, football player 
Sami Bayraktar, futsal player
Engin Bekdemir, football player
Kadir Bekmezci, football player 
Hakan Bilgiç, football player
Ümit Bilican, football player 
Sinan Bolat, football player 
Fuat Çapa, football manager
Güven Çavuş, football player 
Ramazan Çevik, football player 
Kahraman Demirtaş, football player 
Murat Direkçi, middleweight kickboxer
Ferhat Dogruel, football player 
Yunus Gülnar, football player 
Umut Gündoğan, football player
Emrullah Güvenç, football player
Serdal Güvenç, football player
Abdullah İçel, futsal player
Sefa İşçi, football player
Adnan Januzaj, football player 
Yasin Karaca, football player 
Ahmet Karadayi, football player 
Burak Kardeş, football player 
Gökhan Kardeş, football player 
Ferhat Kaya, football player 
Onur Kaya, football player 
Ersan Keleş, futsal player
Anıl Koç, football player
Fazlı Kocabaş, football player 
Halil Köse, football player 
Ömer Kulga, football player
Mohamed Ali Kurtuluş, football player 
Muhammed Mert, football player 
Ahmet Öcal, football player
Hasan Özkan, football player 
Alpaslan Öztürk, football player 
Ferhat Poyraz, football player 
Aziz Sağlam, futsal player
Enes Sağlık, football player
, boxer
Erdem Şen, football player 
Taner Taktak, football player
Mickaël Tirpan, football player (Turkish father) 
Önder Turacı, football player 
Fatih Turan, football player
Adnan Ugur, football player
Alper Uludağ, football player 
, football player 
Cüneyt Vicil, futsal player 
Ali Yaşar, football player 
Hüseyin Yıldız, futsal player 
Muhammet Hanifi Yoldaş, football player 
Sara Yuceil, female football player

Victims of crime
Songül Koç, shot by Hans Van Themsche in 2006

See also 
Turks in Belgium
List of Belgians

References

 
Belgians
Turkish